{{DISPLAYTITLE:Nu2 Lyrae}}

Nu2 Lyrae, Latinized from ν2 Lyrae, or sometimes simply Nu Lyrae, is a solitary star in the northern constellation of Lyra. Based upon an annual parallax shift of 14.09 mas as seen from Earth, it is located around 231 light years from the Sun. With an apparent visual magnitude of 5.23, it is bright enough to be faintly visible to the naked eye.

This is a white-hued A-type main sequence star with a stellar classification of A3 V. At an estimated age of 214 million years, it is spinning with a projected rotational velocity of 128 km/s. This is giving the star an oblate shape with an equatorial bulge that is 5% larger than the polar radius. Nu2 Lyrae has an estimated 1.9 times the mass of the Sun and about 1.5 times the Sun's radius. It is radiating 32 times the solar luminosity from its photosphere at an effective temperature of around 8,912 K.

References

A-type main-sequence stars
Lyra (constellation)
Lyrae, Nu2
Lyrae, 09
174602
092405
7102
Durchmusterung objects